A Drive into the Blue (German: Die Fahrt ins Blaue) is a 1919 German silent comedy film directed by Rudolf Biebrach and starring Henny Porten, Georg Alexander, and Jakob Tiedtke.

It was shot at the Tempelhof Studios in Berlin. The film's sets were designed by the art director Kurt Richter.

Synopsis
A young female bank cashier wins a lottery whose prize is a car.

Cast
 Jakob Tiedtke as Warenhausbesitzer Herr Paetz 
 Franz Verdier as Abteilungschef 
 Henny Porten as Wanda Lossen - Kassiererin 
 Sophie Pagay as Frau Schulze - ihre Wirtin 
 Georg Alexander as Dr. Erich Fuld - Schriftsteller 
 Herr Brögel as Alfred Bessel - sein Freund 
 Robert Scholz as Ernst Holl - sein Freund 
 Paul Biensfeldt as Simon - Diener bei Fuld

References

Bibliography
 Bock, Hans-Michael & Bergfelder, Tim. The Concise CineGraph. Encyclopedia of German Cinema. Berghahn Books, 2009.

External links

1919 films
Films of the Weimar Republic
Films directed by Rudolf Biebrach
German silent feature films
German black-and-white films
UFA GmbH films
Films shot at Tempelhof Studios
German comedy films
1919 comedy films
Silent comedy films
1910s German films
1910s German-language films